Edilbay sheep (Edilbaı qoıy), also known as Edilbaev(skaya) sheep, are a breed of domesticated sheep which originated in northern Kazakhstan.  This breed belongs to the coarse-wooled fat-tailed type of sheep and the Kazakh group.  It originated in the 19th century as a cross between Kazakh fat-tailed sheep and Kalmyk/Astrakhan coarse-wooled sheep. Today, it is found in Kazakhstan (2,419,000 head as of 1980) and Russia (20,100 head as of 2003).

Characteristics
Edilbaevskaya sheep are very hardy, as they were breed to conform to nomadic life in the semi-deserts and deserts of Kazakhstan.  They are adapted to severe winter frosts and summer droughts, can travel over long distances and thrive in poor feed conditions.

Their yearly lambing rate is 110–120 lambs born for every 100 ewes.

They are mainly bred for their meat and tail fat.

The milk, though of lesser importance, is also used commercially, in the production of ayran, qurt, and butter.  Ewes have a yearly milk yield of 152 L on average.  Fat content ranges from 3–9%, with an average of 5.8%.

Their wool production surpasses all other breeds of the Kazakh fat-tailed type, both in yield and quality. The fleece consists of true wool with a fineness of 18.0 μm (54% on average), intermediate fibres (33.1 μm, 17.5% avg.), and guard hair (59.5 μm, 26%avg.). Kemp is rarely found.

Notes

References

Further reading
 “EDILBAEV (Edilbaevskaya)”, pp. 237–238 of N.G. Dmitriev, L.K. Ernst (eds.): Animal genetic resources of the USS.  FAO Animal Production And Health Paper 65.  Rome: Food And Agriculture Organization Of The United Nations, 1989.    (pdf)

Sheep breeds
Sheep breeds originating in Kazakhstan